Orene Ai'i (born 23 September 1979) is a Samoan-born, New Zealand rugby union player who played as a first five-eighth and fullback for the Blues in Super Rugby and Northland in the ITM Cup. He is currently a player and assistant backs coach for the LA Giltinis in Major League Rugby (MLR).

Professional career
Ai'i made his professional rugby debut in 2000 against the ACT Brumbies.

He previously played for Toyota Verblitz in Japan and Toulon in France.

Starting in August 2016, he played fly-half/fullback for the San Francisco Rush in PRO Rugby, America's first professional rugby league.

Ai'i re-joined the Blues as an injury cover after his contract with Toyota Verblitz was completed.

Honours
 2003 Super Rugby champion – Blues
 IRB Sevens World Series player of the year  – 2004-05 season

References

External links

The Blues: Orene Ai'i

New Zealand rugby union players
Samoan rugby union players
1979 births
Living people
Blues (Super Rugby) players
Auckland rugby union players
Northland rugby union players
Hurricanes (rugby union) players
RC Toulonnais players
Toyota Verblitz players
Rugby union fullbacks
Rugby union fly-halves
Samoa international rugby sevens players
People educated at Otahuhu College
Expatriate rugby union players in Japan
Expatriate rugby union players in France
Sportspeople from Apia
San Francisco Rush players
New Zealand international rugby sevens players
LA Giltinis players